Heteradelphia is a genus of flowering plants belonging to the family Acanthaceae.

Its native range is Western Tropical Africa, Gulf of Guinea Islands.

Species:

Heteradelphia paulojaegeria 
Heteradelphia paulowilhelmia

References

Acanthaceae
Acanthaceae genera